Lancers is a brand of medium-sweet, lightly sparkling wine produced by the JM da Fonseca winery in Portugal. The brand was created in 1944, when Vintage Wines of New York predicted that wine consumption in the United States would increase after World War II.

A sparkling Lancers, made by the continuous method, was introduced in the late 1980s. It was originally sold in distinctive squat bottles made of rust-colored, opaque crockery rather than clear glass.

See also
Mateus (wine)

Further reading
Robinson, Jancis (Ed.) The Oxford Companion to Wine. Oxford: Oxford University Press, second edition, 1999.

External links
José Maria da Fonseca homepage (in Portuguese) (in English)

Portuguese wine
Food and drink companies established in 1944
Drink companies of Portugal
Portuguese companies established in 1944